Evil Eye is a 2020 American supernatural horror film directed by Elan and Rajeev Dassani and written by Madhuri Shekar, based on her Audible Original audio play of the same name. The film stars Sarita Choudhury, Sunita Mani and Omar Maskati. It was executive produced by Jason Blum of Blumhouse Television and Priyanka Chopra of Purple Pebble Pictures.

Evil Eye was released on October 13, 2020, by Amazon Studios, as the third installment in the anthological Welcome to the Blumhouse film series.

Plot 
Pallavi lives in New Orleans and has a close but contentious, relationship with her mother Usha, who has moved back to Delhi because of her husband's work. Usha is worried that Pallavi, almost thirty, is still unmarried.  Usha, who is heavily interested in vedic astrology, tries to set her daughter up on arranged dates.

To placate her mother, Pallavi agrees to meet a blind date she set up. The date never shows but Pallavi meets another man, Sandeep, and the two of them begin dating. Sandeep seems like the perfect man: handsome, wealthy, and Indian. When discussing their romantic pasts, Sandeep tells her that a former girlfriend tried to commit suicide when they broke up. When Pallavi rejects Sandeep's attempt to give her earrings, she sees his hands clench in anger, but dismisses it.

She tells Usha about her new boyfriend. But far from being overjoyed, Usha is concerned. An astrologer tells her that Pallavi and Sandeep have unprecedented compatibility.  However, a private investigator Usha hires reports that Sandeep has a string of former girlfriends who are reluctant to talk about him.

Sandeep invites Pallavi to move in with him.  She refuses so he offers to pay for the rent on a new apartment for her so she can quit her job and focus on her aspirations to be a writer. Pallavi moves into the new apartment, but when she tells Usha, her mother believes Sandeep has too much control over her. When Pallavi says Sandeep is doing this for her own good, Usha remembers that her abusive ex-boyfriend used to say this all the time to her and becomes convinced that Sandeep, who was born nine months after Pallavi, is the reincarnation of her old boyfriend, who had died the night Pallavi was born after violently confronting Usha. She tries to convince Pallavi to leave Sandeep, but Pallavi, and everyone else, thinks she is crazy.

When Pallavi gets engaged to Sandeep, Usha has a breakdown.  At the urging of her husband, she agrees to give Sandeep a chance. She confides in her daughter about her past: before she got married she had dated a man who was controlling and abusive. After she broke up with him and married someone else, he would stalk her.  One night, when she was nine months pregnant, he attacked her on a bridge. In the struggle, she pushed him into the river and went into labor that night, giving birth to Pallavi. She was never connected to the ex-boyfriend's death.

Sandeep calls Usha and admits that her suspicions are correct: he is the reincarnation of her former boyfriend. He demands that she travel to America to meet him in person. When she arrives, Sandeep tells her that he wants what he has always wanted: her.  He warns her that if she tries to stop the marriage, he will kill Pallavi. When the three have dinner together, Pallavi becomes suspicious that her fussy mother has suddenly become so supportive. Usha reveals that she has the same set of earrings Sandeep gave to Pallavi, a gift from her ex. Sandeep becomes enraged and attacks Usha. The two women fight him off and injure him.

At the hospital, realizing her mother was right, Pallavi worries about the future, and what might happen with her potential daughters. Usha comforts her as down the hall, Sandeep dies.  The final shot shows a newborn baby, indicating that he has been reincarnated once again.

Cast

 Sarita Choudhury as Usha
 Sunita Mani as Pallavi
 Bernard White as Krishnan
 Omar Maskati as Sandeep
 Anjali Bhimani as Radhika

Production 
Filming took place in New Orleans from November to December 2019.

Release
The film was released on October 13, 2020 alongside Nocturne as one of the first four films in the eight film anthology Welcome to the Blumhouse, after Nocturne, The Lie, and Black Box.

Reception 
The website's critics consensus reads: "With Evil Eye, directors Elan and Rajeev Dassani spy a premise that has no shortage of potential, but despite the efforts of a game cast, it remains tantalizingly unfulfilled." On Metacritic has a weighted average score of 54 out of 100, based on nine critics, indicating "mixed or average reviews".

References

External links
 

2020 films
2020 horror films
2020s supernatural horror films
American films based on plays
American supernatural horror films
Amazon Studios films
Blumhouse Productions films
2020s English-language films
2020s American films